Lim Hyun-ju (born 27 April 1985) is a South Korean television presenter and media personality who challenges the social norms in technologically advanced but culturally conservative South Korea.

In 2018, Lim became the first Korean news presenter to wear glasses on air after she delivered the morning news program MBC News Today wearing glasses.

In 2020, she reignited the bra-free debate by going on air without a bra after she appeared on a MBC documentary program Series M - Do We Need to Wear Bras and shared information and her feelings about the experiment via the social media platform.

References

External links

Living people
South Korean television presenters
South Korean women television presenters
1985 births